Wasungen is a town in the Schmalkalden-Meiningen district, in Thuringia, Germany. It is situated on the river Werra, 11 km north of Meiningen. The former municipalities Hümpfershausen, Metzels, Oepfershausen, Unterkatz and Wahns were merged into Wasungen in January 2019.

The Pfaffenburg was built in 1378 and reconstructed in 1974.

References 

Schmalkalden-Meiningen
Duchy of Saxe-Meiningen